Water Boyy is a 2015 Thai LGBT drama film directed by Rachi Kusonkusiri and starring Ngern Luangsodsai Anupart as "Nam", and Beam Papangkorn as "Meuk". It was filmed primarily in Thailand.

In early March, it was revealed that there will be a remake named: Water Boyy: The Series with different actors. New characters are added including Earth Pirapat Watthanasetsiri as "Waii" and New Thitipoom Techaapaikhun as "Apo". It started airing on April 9, 2017.

Plot
At Ocean High School in Hua Hin District, Nam (Luangsodsai Anupart) is a swimmer who does well despite a lack of training. He is popular on campus and has many girlfriends, inspiring envy among his peers, and also has a love of pornography which he needs to watch to sleep. However, his relationship with his father, swimming coach Neung (Nappon Gomarachun), is strained. Nine (Ausavaterakul Ausavapat), does Nam's homework and tutors him so Nam can teach him how to swim. Another swimmer, Muek (Beam Prapangkorn), becomes Nam's roommate. After Muek moves in, Nam is less interested in watching pornography. However, Muek has a girlfriend, Nune (Kitwiriya Natcharee), an actress, who shows up for the Super League Swimming Competition at Changmai. This turns out to be a competition for love. But during the process the two boys find themselves falling in love with each other.

Cast

Soundtrack/OST
Here are the songs in this movie:

Track listing

Production
The film represented a comeback for actor Nappon Gomarachun, who last worked in the film industry five years ago. He said that Director Rachi Kusonkusiri wanted to make the film, and it reflects how common disagreements between parents and children in Thailand were.

Reception
The film was released on 22 October 2015. Madame Aung Tour, writer for Thai Rath, said that while the title Water Boyy created the impression that the film is about swimming, it is more about a father-son relationship and also a love story. She recommended the film for its atmosphere. Coconuts Bangkok stated that without the LGBT theme, the film would be a generic love story.

References

External links
Water Boyy at the Internet Movie Database
Water Boyy at SiamZone.com
"แม่เงิน เลิฟซิก โวย! Waterboyy จูบเสียว ลั่น! เอาลูกออกจากวงการ อ่านข่าวต่อได้ที่,"  Thai Rath, 29 October 2015, URL accessed 13 September 2016.

2015 films
Thai LGBT-related films
Cosocomo films
2015 LGBT-related films